Wanderer of the Wasteland is a 1935 American Western film directed by Otho Lovering and written by Stuart Anthony. It is based on the 1923 novel Wanderer of the Wasteland by Zane Grey. The film stars Dean Jagger, Gail Patrick, Edward Ellis, Monte Blue, Buster Crabbe and Trixie Friganza. The film was released on September 9, 1935, by Paramount Pictures.

Cast       
Dean Jagger as Adam Larey
Gail Patrick as Ruth Virey
Edward Ellis as Dismukes
Monte Blue as Guerd Larey
Buster Crabbe as Big Ben
Trixie Friganza as Big Jo
Raymond Hatton as Merryvale
Charles Waldron as Mr. Virey
Anna Q. Nilsson as Mrs. Virey
Leif Erickson as Lawrence 
Tammany Young as Paducah
Kenneth Harlan as Bob
Fuzzy Knight as Deputy Scott
Benny Baker as Piano Player
Stanley Andrews as Sheriff Collinshaw
Jim Thorpe as Charlie Jim
Alfred Delcambre as Deputy Hines
Al St. John as Tattooer
Chester Gan as Ling
Pat O'Malley as Jed

Preservation status
 A print and trailer are held at the Library of Congress.

References

External links
 

1935 films
American Western (genre) films
1935 Western (genre) films
Paramount Pictures films
Films directed by Otho Lovering
American black-and-white films
Films based on American novels
1930s English-language films
1930s American films